The Park Slope Food Coop (PSFC) is a food cooperative located in the Park Slope neighborhood of Brooklyn in New York City. It is one of the oldest and largest active food co-ops in the United States. As a food cooperative, one of its goals is to be a "buying agent to its members, not a selling agent to any industry." Non-members are welcome to visit the store, but may not shop.

Formed in 1973, PSFC had grown to include over 17,000 members as of April 2018.  The PSFC business model requires each of its adult members to contribute 2 hours and 45 minutes of work every six weeks, and that no member share a household with a non-member. In exchange, active members may shop at the store. The store sells a variety of foods and household goods, some environmentally friendly products, at a 21% markup over the wholesale price (compared to 26-100% at a supermarket). An additional temporary 4% markup was implemented in October 2020 to help the co-op offset the financial impacts of COVID-19. Members facing financial hardship may opt-out. The savings are possible because labor is contributed by its members. PSFC operates as a New York state cooperative corporation.

Governance and management

PSFC, a cooperative corporation formed under the laws of the State of New York, is run by a Board of Directors consisting of five persons elected to staggered three-year terms by and from the membership. The longest-serving General Coordinator present at the meeting (usually Joe Holtz) serves as a voting member ex officio.

The Board of Directors gather monthly to hear the advice of the members at the General Meeting (GM), and generally approve all resolutions passed by the GM. The GM agenda is governed by an Agenda Committee, and the meeting itself is run by a Chair Committee, whose members rotate in service as chairperson and collectively serve as GM parliamentarian.

The day-to-day operations of the PSFC are run by paid employees called coordinators. The senior-ranking coordinators, called General Coordinators, are hired by the General Meeting and approved by the Board of Directors.

The coop has a Diversity and Equality Committee, whose members receive workslot credit and which proposes programs to enhance membership diversity at the coop. It also has a biweekly paper called The Linewaiters' Gazette.

History

The PSFC was founded in 1973 by about 10 people including Joe Holtz. The organization initially subleased space with the Mongoose Community Center. By 1977 the Mongoose was defunct and the Coop started renting directly from the landlord.

In 1978, the Coop began renting 782 Union Street with an option to buy upon the expiration of a two-year lease. Expecting to buy, the Coop completed renovations the next year and purchased the building in 1980. This was followed in 1988 and 1999 with the purchase of the two buildings immediately to the west, with renovations completed in 1991 and 2001 respectively.

In December 2009, the Coop paid the remaining $707,000 on the mortgage for all three buildings. This pre-payment was made without penalty, as the mortgage holder, National Cooperative Bank, needed assistance after the banking crisis of 2008–2009.

Political and environmental action
The coop has a long history of political action. During the apartheid regime, goods from South Africa were banned; during the Pinochet regime, Chilean grapes were removed; Nestlé products were banned because of the company's campaign to promote infant formula instead of breastfeeding.

Coop policy dictates that existing boycotts are discontinued unless renewed annually. Since 2004, the PSFC has boycotted Coca-Cola products (including Minute Maid and Odwalla), citing the company's labor practices and exploitation of natural resources in third-world countries. Since 2010, the PSFC has boycotted Flaum Appetizing Products for violations of labor law. Flaum is a local kosher producer known for hummus sold under its "Mike & Joe's" label.

In 2008, the PSFC General Meeting resolved that the coop would discontinue selling bottled water  and stop providing plastic shopping bags at checkout.

The Coop collects a variety of hard-to-recycle plastic packaging for upcycling. This recycling initiative started with the collecting of yogurt cups to be upcycled into toothbrushes and other personal care goods by Recycline in 2008, at a time when New York City's municipal recycling limited the types of plastic accepted. With changes in NYC's trash recycling policies, the Park Slope Food Coop put together the hard-to-recycle plastics collection currently in place with Terracycle for single serve baby food pouches, plastic cling wrap, produce bags, toothbrushes, toothpaste tubes, and water filters.

In 2009, The Jewish Daily Forward incorrectly stated or implied that the coop was considering a ban on Israeli products in protest of the 2009 Israeli military offensive in Gaza. In actuality, no such proposal had been placed on the agenda of the PSFC General Meeting (GM). The stories were based on two letters-to-the-editor in the February 12, 2009 edition of the PSFC's Linewaiters' Gazette. The Gazette publishes member submissions regardless of opinion.  For three years members of the coop expressed their opinions in the Gazette regarding a potential boycott of Israel, and the July 26, 2011, General Meeting discussed holding a coop-wide referendum on joining the BDS movement, with no action taken. The March 27, 2012 GM, which was held at Brooklyn Technical High School due to an unprecedented turnout of nearly 1,700 members (eleven times more than typical), after a heated discussion considered and rejected a proposal to hold such a referendum.

In 2010, in response to an announcement by the menswear retailer Barneys New York that they would be opening a location in Brooklyn called Barneys Coop, the PSFC General Meeting (GM) considered taking action in light of the company's apparent violation of New York's Cooperative Corporations Law, which restricts the use of the term "coop" to cooperative businesses. The general coordinators informed the state attorney general of the violation and presented a plan for a lawsuit to the July 2010 GM, which rejected the proposal for anticipated costs. A more limited proposal was approved by the August 2010 GM but later overturned on procedural grounds.

On January 26, 2016, the Park Slope Food Coop voted in a change to The Rules For The General Meeting.  It stipulated that in order to pass any boycott, a super-majority of at least 75% of the General Meeting must agree to the boycott.

Unionization efforts
In the summer of 2018 a group of paid staff at the Park Slope Food Coop started unionizing efforts with the help of RWDSU, a union representing grocery store employees and other food chain workers. Among the issues raised are job security (an end to "at-will employment"), unequal treatment in the work place (racism and other forms of discrimination) and a desire to better align the Coop with international cooperative principles and values of democracy, equality, equity, and solidarity.

On April 23, 2019 several employees filed charges of unfair labor practices with the National Labor Relations Board. The complaint includes allegations of harassment, coercive statements and interrogation. Given the alleged unlawful interference in the unionization process by management, the General Coordinators of the Coop have agreed to guarantee non-interference in the unionization efforts, this has been disputed by union organizers and has been one of the issues that led to the NLRB complaint. The Park Slope Food Coop's Labor Committee, a group founded to provide "leadership and information on the labor issues that impact the coop’s food system," voiced their support of a neutrality agreement.

The NLRB settled with the Coop regarding the Unfair Labor Practice charges, as a result the Park Slope Food Coop was required to post a notice to employees stating that going forward specified labor rights will not be violated.

Criticism
PSFC's work shift requirement, which includes every adult member of a household having to partake, has inspired criticism over the years. In 2011,  The New York Times also reported allegations in February 2011 that some members were asking their nannies to cover their work shifts.

Membership

In order to join the co-op, new members must attend an orientation and sign up for a monthly 2h 45min volunteer shift.  The volunteer positions fall into the following categories:  food processing, inventory, maintenance, office, receiving & stocking, second floor service desk, shopping, soup kitchen prep, and soup kitchen at CHiPS (a local charity organization).  All slots other than the last two directly relate to the daily operation of the co-op.

After shift assignment, new members have a month to pay their one-time membership fee (regular: $25 or low-income reduced rate: $5) and eight weeks to pay their membership investment deposit (regular: $100 or low-income reduced rate: $10) which will be returned if they decide leave the co-op.

Members must show up and work their volunteer shifts once a month, but if they cannot make their usual shift they have the option to swap shifts with another member.  If a member misses their shift, they must complete two make-up shifts before their next shift.  The strictness of this policy has been criticized as unfair to single parents, members with multiple outside jobs, and students, since an excess of required make-up shifts requires significant working hours that may be unmanageable without external support.

Unpaid membership fees or unmet shifts lead to a status of "Alert," and then ultimately "Suspended," which prevent a member from entering and shopping at the co-op.

Senior members are eligible 'retire' from their volunteer duties, with retirement age dependent on total years of membership.  Chronically ill members and anyone under 18 are also not required to work.  Temporary injuries and sickness can be taken into account to excuse volunteer duties.

On Monday, March 23, 2020, for the first time in their history, the co-op suspended their member work requirement in order to reduce the risk of COVID-19 infection to paid staff. The co-op operated purely by existing and temporary paid workers until mid-October 2020, when a voluntary member labor program began for select assignments.

See also
 List of food cooperatives

References

Further reading

External links

Food Coop - 2018 documentary about the Park Slope Food Coop
Park Slope Food Coop Union

1973 establishments in New York City
Companies based in Brooklyn
Retail companies established in 1973
Consumers' cooperatives in the United States
Food cooperatives in the United States
Park Slope